Duras: Duchamp is an album of contemporary classical music by American composer and saxophonist/multi-instrumentalist John Zorn consisting two tribute compositions for Marguerite Duras and Marcel Duchamp.

All tracks were recorded at Avatar on May 1, 1997. The only exception being track 5, which was at Shelly Palmer Studio a month to the day prior.

Reception
The Allmusic review by Stacia Proefrock awarded the album 4 stars and states that "This album shows that some of his best work can come when he is composing around a philosophical core instead of just playing with sound. If this is not one of his most complex classical pieces, it is at least one of his most beautiful in its embodiment of the spirit of the two honored artists".

Track listing
All compositions by John Zorn.
 "Duras: Premiere Livre" – 14:41 
 "Duras: Deuxième Livre" – 0:51
 "Duras: Troisième Livre" – 16:46
 "Duras: Epilogue" – 1:46
 "Étant Donnés: 69 Paroxyms for Marcel Duchamp" – 13:17

Personnel
Christine Bard – percussion 
Anthony Coleman – piano 
Cenovia Cummins – violin 
Mark Feldman – violin 
Erik Friedlander – cello 
John Medeski – organ 
Jim Pugliese – percussion 
John Zorn – conductor

References

1997 albums
Albums produced by John Zorn
John Zorn albums
Tzadik Records albums